One Day is the sixth studio album by Canadian post-hardcore band Fucked Up. The album was released on January 27, 2023, through Merge Records, four years after their previous album Dose Your Dreams, making it the longest gap between studio albums in the band's career. 

Three singles were released ahead of the album's release: the self-titled track and "Found", which were released in late 2022, and "I Think I Might Be Weird", which came out in early 2023. 

One Day was well-received by contemporary music critics, with the album enjoying "universal acclaim" on Metacritic and AnyDecentMusic?.

Background 
The recording process of the album took over the course of three years, in part due to the impact of the COVID-19 pandemic on the music industry. The guitars of the album were recorded one day December 2019 at Candle Studios in Toronto, while the bass and vocals were recorded in February 2020 at Palmer Stone Studios and Candle Stone Studios, respectively. 

Due to the COVID-19 pandemic, the final mixing and mastering did not occur until April 2022. Mixing was undertaken by Alex Gamble while mastering was undertaken by Heba Kadry. Bandmember Mike Haliechuk undertook production.

Promotion and release

Singles 
Three singles were released in promotion of the album. The first track, the self-titled track, came out on October 25, 2022. On November 15, 2022, the band released the second single, "Found". The third single, "I Think I Might Be Weird" came out on January 11, 2023.

Track listing

Personnel 
Fucked Up
 Damian Abraham – lead vocals (tracks 1–8, 10)
 Jonah Falco – drums, background vocals
 Mike Haliechuk – guitars, background vocals, production (all tracks); lead vocals (9), art direction
 Sandy Miranda – bass guitar, engineering
 Josh Zucker

Additional contributors
 Heba Kadry – mastering
 Alex Gamble – mixing, engineering
 Dylan Frankland – engineering
 James Atkinson – engineering
 Daniel Murphy – design, cover art, layout
 Jeff Bierk – photography, back cover photo
 Andrei Dornovitiy – photography
 Jeaninne Kaufer – photography
 Kirsten Thoen – photography
 Vanessa Heins – photoography

References

External links 
 
 One Days at Genius
 
 Dose Your Dreams at Merge Records

2023 albums
Fucked Up albums
Merge Records albums